Leptomyrmex pallens is a species of ant in the genus Leptomyrmex. Described by Carlo Emery in 1883, the species is only endemic to New Caledonia.

References

Dolichoderinae
Insects of New Caledonia
Insects described in 1883